KSAS-FM (103.5 MHz, "Kiss-FM") is a commercial radio station located in Caldwell, Idaho, broadcasting to the Boise, Idaho area.  KSAS-FM airs a Top 40 (CHR) music format.

The station made headlines in April 2008 when its afternoon disc jockey, Steve "KeKe Luv" Kicklighter, set an unofficial world record by going 175 consecutive hours without sleep, on the air. The stunt was timed to the start of National Child Abuse Prevention Month, in order to bring attention to that cause.  In April 2009, Keke Luv ran 7 marathons in 7 days to raise awareness to child abuse.

History
Before becoming top 40 KSAS had the KARO call letters which now belong to a Christian worship music station in Boise. In the mid-1990s, KARO was an all '70s music format as Arrow 103 until 1997 when KARO switched to an AOR rock format, competing between classic rock KKGL, then Active Rock J105 and alternative leaning KQXR. Going back to the station's beginnings as KQZQ, they originally aired an automated adult Top 40 format (TM Production's "Stereo Rock" format) as Z-103.

In 2000 KARO flipped to Top 40/CHR becoming 103.3 Kiss FM, making the return of the Kiss FM moniker in the Boise market for the first time since the former CHR station KIYS dropped 92 Kiss FM and switched to country as Kissin' 92 (KIZN) ten years prior. It became a formidable competition to the other top 40's in the Treasure Valley. From 2000 to 2013 the other stations Music Monster 99.1 (KTPZ as an all-80s format) and 93.1 Hit Music Now (KZMG [now KBOI-FM]) exited the format.

On November 16, 2006, Clear Channel Communications planned to sell 448 of its radio stations outside the top 100 markets including KSAS-FM, along with Boise's sister stations including KCIX, KTMY (now KAWO), KXLT-FM, KIDO, and KFXD. In March 2007, Peak Broadcasting LLC bought the latter stations, making Boise one of the largest markets without any radio stations owned by the future iHeartMedia.

By 2012 103.3 Kiss FM had the current pop market all to itself.
On August 30, 2013, a deal was announced in which Townsquare Media would purchase Peak Broadcasting's stations, including KSAS-FM, as part of the deal in which Cumulus Media would acquire Dial Global. As part of the deal, Townsquare swapped Peak's Fresno, California stations to Cumulus for its stations in Dubuque, Iowa and Poughkeepsie, New York, since Peak, Townsquare, and Dial Global were all controlled by Oaktree Capital Management. The sale to Townsquare was completed on November 14, 2013.

On October 31, 2013, at 5PM, KSAS moved from 103.3 FM to 103.5 FM.  The realignment allowed for KZMG to return albeit as an Adult top 40 station. The last song on 103.3 Kiss FM was "Let The Children Play" by local rapper Infectious, and the first on 103.5 Kiss FM was "Baby Got Back" by Sir Mix-a-Lot.

References

External links
KSAS-FM official website

SAS-FM
Contemporary hit radio stations in the United States
Caldwell, Idaho
Radio stations established in 1982
Townsquare Media radio stations
1982 establishments in Idaho